The 8th General Assembly of Prince Edward Island represented the colony of Prince Edward Island between 10 August 1806 and 1812.

The Assembly sat at the pleasure of the Governor of Prince Edward Island, Joseph Frederick Wallet DesBarres.  Robert Hodgson was elected speaker.

Members

The members of the Prince Edward Island Legislature after the general election of 1806 were:

Notes:

External links 
 Journal of the House of Assembly of Prince Edward Island (1806)

Terms of the General Assembly of Prince Edward Island
1806 establishments in Prince Edward Island
1812 disestablishments in Prince Edward Island